The Ralph E. Simmons Memorial State Forest (formerly the St. Mary's State Forest) is in the U.S. state of Florida. The  forest is located in northeastern Florida, near Hilliard, although it's closer to Boulogne. The forest was renamed in 1996 for Ralph E. Simmons, a former member of the St. Johns River Water Management District Governing Board. 

Access to the forest is available from Lake Hampton Road, the northernmost west to east paved road in Nassau County.

See also
List of Florida state forests
List of Florida state parks

References

External links
 Ralph E. Simmons Memorial State Forest: Florida Division of Forestry- FDACS

Florida state forests
Protected areas of Nassau County, Florida